Mustapha Biskri (born 29 July 1960) is an Algerian football manager.

References

1960 births
Living people
Algerian football managers
CA Batna managers
USM Annaba managers
RC Kouba managers
CA Bordj Bou Arréridj managers
MO Béjaïa managers
JSM Skikda managers
JSM Béjaïa managers
DRB Tadjenanet managers
Algerian Ligue Professionnelle 1 managers
21st-century Algerian people